Mark Joseph (born 1 February 1965) is a Welsh retired footballer who played most of his career in Finland.

Joseph played eight seasons in Finnish lower divisions and was signed by premier division club FC Ilves in 1993. He played four seasons and 83 caps in Veikkausliiga for FC Ilves from 1993 to 1996. Joseph ended his career in second tier clubs TPV, TP-55 and RiPS. He still lives in Finland and works at a local sports pub in Tampere.

References

External links 
 

1965 births
Sportspeople from Chester
Welsh footballers
Welsh expatriate footballers
Wrexham A.F.C. players
FC Ilves players
Tampereen Pallo-Veikot players
Veikkausliiga players
Expatriate footballers in Finland
Living people
Welsh expatriate sportspeople in Finland
Mold Alexandra F.C. players
Association football defenders
Oswestry Town F.C. players
Rhyl F.C. players